The following is a list of notable individuals who were born in and/or have lived in Annandale, Virginia.

Arts and entertainment
 Pierce Askegren, author
 Myriam Avalos, classical pianist
 Tony Cavalero, actor and comedian
 Mark Hamill, actor
 Rob Huebel, actor and comedian
 Christopher Johnson McCandless, itinerant and subject of author Jon Krakauer's 1996 book, Into the Wild
 Pat McGee, singer-songwriter
Robert Stanton, actor
 Kelly Willis, country singer-songwriter

Business
 Anthony Myint, author and restaurateur

Politics and government
 Jeffrey Bell, author and political consultant
 Fawn Hall,  notable figure in the Iran-Contra affair
 Susan Hutchison, Chair of the Washington State Republican Party, former television news anchor
 August Larson, USMC Major general
Joe Morrissey, Virginia State Senator, former member of the Virginia House of Delegates; former Virginia Commonwealth Attorney
 Robert Sarvis, Libertarian candidate for Governor in the 2013 election
 Cao Van Vien, former Chairman of the South Vietnamese Joint General Staff
 Kevin Whitaker, U.S. Ambassador to Colombia
 Vivian E. Watts, member of the Virginia House of Delegates

Science
 Frank Cepollina, engineer and inventor

Sports
 Ray Crittenden, football player
 Chuck Drazenovich, football player
 Mark Duffner, football coach
 Bill Hamid, professional soccer player for D.C. United
 Arthur Jackson, Olympic medalist sport shooter
 Michael Lahoud, professional soccer player for Chivas USA
 Tommy Steenberg, figure skater
 Carl Strong, soccer player
 Don Whitmire, football player

References

Annandale, Virginia
Annandale
Annandale, Virginia